Michael Evan Rowland (born January 31, 1953) is a former pitcher in Major League Baseball who played for the San Francisco Giants in parts of two seasons from 1980 to 1981. Listed at 6' 3", 205 lb., Rowland batted and threw right handed. He was born in Chicago, Illinois. 

Rowland attended Millikin University in Decatur, Illinois, where he played for the Millikin Big Blue baseball team in 1975.

The Giants selected Rowland in the 22nd round of the 1975 MLB Draft. He garnered popularity in his short stint as a Giants middle reliever through his trademark moustache and permed hair. 

Rowland made 28 pitching appearances for the Giants (one start), going 1–2 with a 2.74 earned run average without saves. In addition, he hit a single and drove in a run in his only major league at-bat.

Besides, Rowland posted a 64–78 record with a 4.28 ERA in eight Minor League seasons from 1975–1982, and also played winter ball with the Cardenales de Lara club of the Venezuelan League in its 1977-78 season.

Afterwards, Rowland gained induction into the Millikin University Athletics Hall of Fame as part of their 1984 Class.

Sources

External links
, or Retrosheet

1953 births
Living people
Baseball players from Chicago
Cardenales de Lara players
American expatriate baseball players in Venezuela
Fresno Giants players
Great Falls Giants players
Lafayette Drillers players
Major League Baseball pitchers
Millikin Big Blue baseball players
Phoenix Giants players
San Francisco Giants players
Waterbury Giants players